Haimirichia is an extinct genus of mackerel shark from the late Cenomanian epoch of the Cretaceous period. It  currently contains a single species: H. amonensis. Teeth now assigned to this genus were originally attributed to the Odontaspis. Exquisitely preserved remains from the Akrabou Formation Lagerstätte in Agoult, Morocco allowed the species to be moved into a new genus and family. Microscopic study revealed specialized dermal denticles likely used in electroreception. It's tooth and head design suggest a lifestyle similar to the extant Triaenodon obesus, a novel one for Lamniformes. Roulletia has a similar tooth design and may be part of the same family.

References

Lamniformes
Cenomanian genera